Dilip Buildcon Limited (DBL) is a construction and infrastructure development company based at Bhopal, Madhya Pradesh in India. It was founded by Mr. Dilip Suryavanshi in 1987 and got incorporated in the Ministry of Corporate Affairs on 12 June 2006. The company is listed on both the Bombay Stock Exchange (BSE) and on the National Stock Exchange (NSE) since August 2016.

History 
Dilip Buildcon Limited (DBL) was founded in 1987 in Bhopal by Mr. Dilip Suryavanshi. DBL is the successor of Dilip Builders that was founded as a proprietorship concern in 1988-89. DBL is a Class A-V Firm, registered with Public Works Department Bhopal and also with the Water Resource Department Madhya Pradesh. The Company was incorporated as Dilip Buildcon Private Limited on 12 June 2006 as a private limited company under the Companies Act 1956 with the Registrar of Companies Gwalior. Subsequently the business of M/s Dilip Builders, a sole proprietorship concern has been taken over by the Company in 2007. The Company registered as a Public limited company in August 2010. In the initial years of its operation, the company focused on commercial & residential buildings creating many marquee projects in Madhya Pradesh.

In August 2016, the company was listed in Bombay Stock Exchange (BSE) and National Stock Exchange (NSE) and is regularly traded on both.

Growth
As business grew in the early 90's the company forayed into other types of construction as well. The first move was into water sanitation & sewage.

After that the company also did structural designing & construction in the field of oil & gas industry. At the end of the 1990s when the new central government put forward a vision of connecting the country with roads, DBL saw it as a huge opportunity & dived headfirst into it. After facing stiff resistance on multiple fronts by the established players & stakeholders DBL finally got a start in the sector with a small road project.

From 2012, the company started pursuing bigger projects of roads across the country. In the meantime to fuel the nation's growth the government came up with the PPP model for roads inviting attention from other industries into the sector.

DBL positioned itself to work tirelessly to improve its EPC capabilities & invested heavily in procuring the road building equipment from around the world.

During the Financial Year 2016-17 Dilip Buildcon entered into the Securities Market through initial public offering (IPO).

EPC Projects
Dilip Buildcon undertakes projects on an Engineering, Procurement and Construction (EPC) basis. This includes special bridges and tunnel. Dilip Buildcon and its joint venture (JV) has entered a pact with the National Highways Authority of India (NHAI) for a Rs 1,000-crore highway project in Rajasthan. The project will be built on the EPC mode.

Highways
Dilip Buildcon sharpened its focus on National Highways, especially the Expressway.

Metro Rail
Dilip Buildcon Limited (DBL) on 25 September 2020 launched the first 8.5-meter wide pre-cast segment at the proposed Kendriya Vidyalay metro station for building the elevated viaduct of the Bhopal Metro Rail project.

Mining
DBL has received an MDO contract signed in 2018 with Punjab State Power Corporation Ltd (PSPCL) for the development and operation of the Pachhwara Central coal mine. DBL bags another Mine Developer and Operator (MDO) for development and operation of the Siarmal Open Cast Project of Mahanadi Coalfield Ltd. a subsidiary of Coal India Limited for 25 years.

Irrigation
For the construction of 2 irrigation projects i.e. Kundaliya Dam at a cost of Rs 3,400 crore and Mohanpura Dam at Rs 3,866 crores, the Madhya Pradesh state government tendered Dilip Buildcon Ltd. 
Mohanpura Dam at Rajgarh is a milestone project by Dilip Buildcon and was inaugurated by the Prime Minister of India.

Key projects
 Bangalore-Chennai Expressway (three sections totaling 74 km only)
 Bhopal Metro
 Bundelkhand Expressway (45 km only)
 Delhi-Mumbai Expressway (08 km only)
 Taxiway at Goa International Airport
 Gorakhpur Link Expressway (43 km only)
 Indore Metro
 Mumbai-Nagpur Expressway (45 km only)
 Rajkot Airport
 New Zuari Bridge, Goa
 Bengaluru-Mysuru Expressway (117 km)

Awards
2018 Silver Awards for Excellence in Construction Management felicitated by Nitin Gadkari.

See also
 Dineshchandra R. Agrawal Infracon
 Reliance Infrastructure
 Sadbhav Engineering
 IRB Infrastructure

References 

Companies based in Madhya Pradesh
Indian companies established in 1987
Real estate companies established in 1987
Companies listed on the National Stock Exchange of India
Companies listed on the Bombay Stock Exchange
Construction and civil engineering companies of India
Construction and civil engineering companies established in 1987
1987 establishments in Madhya Pradesh